Păcuraru is a Romanian name, meaning "shepherd", derived from Latin pecurarius, from pecoris, "flock", a derivation of pecus , "sheep". Alternate spelling include Păcurar  (especially in Transylvania), Păcurariu and Pekurar (among Romanian speakers in Vojvodina). It is a cognate of the standard Italian word for shepherd "pecoraio". 

 Johnny Pacar, born John Edward Pacuraru, American actor
 Mircea Păcurariu, Romanian theologian
 Paul Păcuraru, Romanian actor
 Vasile Păcuraru, Romanian football player

See also 
 Păcurarul River
 Pekurár
 Pecoraro

Romanian-language surnames
Occupational surnames

ro:Păcuraru